The Xian MA600 (MA for 新舟, "Modern Ark") is an improved version of the Xian MA60 manufactured by the Xi'an Aircraft Industry Corporation under the Aviation Industry Corporation of China (AVIC).

Xi'an Aircraft Industry Corporation rolled out its first MA600 turboprop on 29 June 2008. MA600 made its maiden flight on 10 October 2008. The aircraft is equipped with new avionics, improved passenger cabin and engines with increased thrust when compared to MA60.

Powered by Pratt & Whitney Canada PW127J turboprop engines, it has a 60-passenger capacity.

As of October 2018, over 300 have been ordered.

Xi'an Aircraft Industry Co., manufacturer of the MA600, noted that the successful test flight is "an important milestone" in Chinese domestic aircraft production. MD Meng Xiangkai revealed that the aircraft is expected to obtain its airworthiness certificate and enter service in the second half of 2009, with the first delivery to the Civil Aviation Flight University of China in Sichuan Province. Batch delivery will start in 2010.

The aircraft will be equipped with the Becker-Communications "DVCS6100 Digital Intercom System,Cabin Intercommunication and Passenger Address". The cockpit is equipped with the Rockwell Collins Pro Line 21 avionics suite.

Various operators in Asia and Africa have ordered 310 (March 2018).

Variants

MA600
Passenger airliner variant

MA600F
Freighter variant with cargo door on starboard side. Cargo hold can accommodate five LD3’s or five 88″x54″ pallets.

MA700 
The MA700 is the development of MA600, which is a stretched version of MA60 with up to 86 seats. the Maiden flight is scheduled for November 2019, and expected deliveries to buyers are scheduled to begin in 2021. The MA700 will adopt advanced technologies such as fly-by-wire control and modular avionics and will replace its predecessors including the MA60 and its variants. MA700 is designed to have an increase of fuel efficiency of 20% and the reduction of operating cost of 10% in comparison to MA600, despite being larger than MA600.

Operators
 Civil Aviation Flight University of China – 1 delivered and 1 on order
 China Air Cargo Co. Ltd - MA600F
 Lao People's Liberation Army Air Force - 2
 Malawi Air force received  - 2 planes in service as of March 2023.

Specifications (MA600)

See also

Notes

References

External links

 MA60 Aircraft – Official Site
 "Maiden Flight of China-Made MA600 Turboprop Aircraft". Test flight video.

2000s Chinese airliners
MA600
Aircraft first flown in 2008
Twin-turboprop tractor aircraft